Rogelio "Roger" Yap (born August 3, 1977) is a Filipino former professional basketball player. He last played for the Manila Stars of the Maharlika Pilipinas Basketball League (MPBL).

He was drafted by Purefoods in 2001 as the ninth pick overall. He is also a former PBL MVP. He is known as a power point guard who can grab rebounds and has a great touch from the perimeter.

He is best known for his playing years as the starting point guard with Purefoods, now known as San Mig Coffee.

Statistics

Correct as of February 18, 2017

Season

|-
| align="left" | 2001
| align="left" | Purefoods
| 33 || 26.0 || .369 || .160 || .419 || 1.8 || .7 || .8 || .1 || 3.7
|-
| align="left" | 2002
| align="left" | Purefoods
| 35 || 16.4 || .336 || .240 || .586 || 2.1 || 2.3 || .5 || .1 || 3.7
|-
| align="left" | 2003
| align="left" | FedEx
| 41 || 22.3 || .409 || .351 || .780 || 2.9 || 2.5 || 1.7 || .2 || 7.1
|-
| align="left" | 2004-05
| align="left" | Shell
| 71 || 24.2 || .432 || .302 || .713 || 3.7 || 3.6 || 1.2 || .3 || 9.0
|-
| align="left" | 2005-06
| align="left" | Purefoods
| 57 || 28.5 || .361 || .230 || .631 || 4.2 || 4.0 || 1.6 || .2 || 7.1
|-
| align="left" | 2006-07
| align="left" | Purefoods
| 38 || 26.8 || .407 || .233 || .622 || 3.2 || 3.0 || 1.1 || .3 || 7.1
|-
| align="left" | 2007-08
| align="left" | Purefoods
| 48 || 28.0 || .399 || .234 || .639 || 4.8 || 3.8 || 1.2 || .3 || 7.5
|-
| align="left" | 2008-09
| align="left" | Purefoods
| 28 || 22.3 || .316 || .190 || .756 || 3.9 || 2.9 || 1.1 || .2 || 4.9
|-
| align="left" | 2009-10
| align="left" | Purefoods/B-Meg Derby Ace
| 64 || 27.4 || .411 || .328 || .731 || 4.6 || 4.0 || 1.0 || .4 || 10.0
|-
| align="left" | 2010-11
| align="left" | B-Meg
| 39 || 28.4 || .355 || .200 || .779 || 4.0 || 4.0 || 1.2 || .3 || 7.0
|-
| align="left" | 2011-12
| align="left" | B-Meg
| 20 || 19.6 || .447 || .200 || .808 || 3.1 || 2.5 || .5 || .2 || 4.6
|-
| align="left" | 2012-13
| align="left" | Barako Bull
| 15 || 19.4 || .465 || .294 || .704 || 2.8 || 1.8 || .6 || .3 || 6.0
|-
| align="left" | Career
| align="left" |
| 489 || 25.0 || .394 || .266 || .689 || 3.6 || 3.2 || 1.1 || .3 || 7.1

References 

1977 births
Living people
Barako Bull Energy players
Basketball players from Cebu
Cebuano people
Filipino men's basketball players
Magnolia Hotshots players
Maharlika Pilipinas Basketball League players
Philippine Basketball Association All-Stars
Point guards
Shell Turbo Chargers players
Shooting guards
USJ-R Jaguars basketball players
Magnolia Hotshots draft picks